Parhippopsis columbiana is a species of beetle in the family Cerambycidae, and the only species in the genus Parhippopsis. It was described by Breuning in 1973.

References

Agapanthiini
Beetles described in 1973
Monotypic beetle genera